Hoàng Thị Ý Nhi (born 1944 in Hội An, Quảng Nam Province) is a Vietnamese poet.

Biography
She grew up in Hanoi. Her father is a well-known playwright Hoang Chau Ky and her husband is professor Nguyen Loc, a former dean of literature department of Hanoi University and the president of Văn Hiến University. Ý Nhi graduated from Hanoi University, where she studied literature in 1968, and lives in Ho Chi Minh City as a branch manager and editor of the Writers Association's publishing group. She was a journalist during the war and is member of the Vietnamese Writer Association.

Works
Y Nhi has published ten poetry collections, including A Woman Knitting (New Works Publisher, Writers Association of Vietnam, 1983), which won the "National Book of the Year Award" in 1984 and two short story collections. With Thanh Thảo, Nguyen Duy and others, Ý Nhi is associated with the Vietnam-American war period but has become better known as a postwar poet. She is one of very few female poets who have attracted the attention of readers by referring to the fate of women in Vietnam. Her poems are among the most modern in emotion and form. Ý Nhi's poetry is characterized by the softness, silence, and loneliness of a woman who last experienced great loss, such as love, in her life. Her work often carries a tone of sadness and sorrow. Ý Nhi's poetry has been translated into numerous languages such as Russian, French, Spanish, German and English and included in many literary magazines and anthologies around the world, especially in the Vietnamese contemporary poetry anthology Black Dog, Black Night (Milkweed Editions, USA, 2008- named “The Best Anthology recognition of Year” by Coldfront Magazine). On November 30, 2015, Y Nhi was awarded 8th Cikada Prize by Sweden for "In recognition of the way she in her poetry
so well has defended the inviolability of life". The prize ceremony was held at the Swedish Ambassador's residence in Hanoi.

References

External links
Fiction Review: Six Vietnamese Poets by Nguyen Ba Chung, Editor, Kevin Bowen, Editor, Martha Collins, Translator Curbstone Press (254p) 
Vietnamese Poetic Tradition
http://milkweed.org/shop/product/181/
 
http://www.utc.edu/Departments/edast/ncta/nash/08/pdf/Keel-AP.pdf
http://www.bbc.com/vietnamese/vietnam/2015/11/151130_nha_tho_y_nhi
Nhà thơ Ý Nhi: Lòng đã nên nhẫn nại - Văn hóa giải trí - Pháp Luật TPHCM Online
"Trước chân dung Akhmatova" - Thơ của Ý Nhi - 10/15/2011 - Thanh Niên
TTLV: Phong cách thơ Ý Nhi | ussh.vnu.edu.vn
Country celebrates National Poetry Day - News.chaobuoisang.net
http://www.thanhnien.com.vn/news/pages/200817/236349.aspx

Living people
1944 births
20th-century Vietnamese poets
Vietnamese women poets
20th-century Vietnamese women writers
21st-century Vietnamese poets
21st-century Vietnamese women writers
People from Quảng Nam province